Kurds in Denmark are Kurds living in Denmark. The number of Kurds is estimated between 25,000 and 30,000 and they come mainly from countries in the Middle East. Most Danish Kurds live in the capital Copenhagen.

In 1993, population of Kurds in Denmark was estimated as 12,000 by Kurdish Institute of Paris (KIP). Today, KIP estimates the same number as 25,000.

See also 
 Kurdish diaspora

References 

Ethnic groups in Denmark
Kurdish diaspora in Europe